Toivo Santeri Salokivi – Johansson until 1900 – (2 September 1886, Turku – 26 March 1940, Helsinki), was a Finnish painter and graphic artist.

Biography

He taught at the Turku Drawing School between 1914–1917 and ran his own painting school in Helsinki between 1931 and 1933. Salokivi's works are greatly influenced by light saturation. His works include impressionistic archipelago motifs, figure compositions and finely executed etchings.

His wife was Majsi Salokivi (1888-1953), née Maria Mattson.

He is buried in the Hietaniemi Cemetery in Helsinki.

Works

See also
 Finnish art

Notes

Sources

Salokivi, Santeri at Uppslagsverket Finland.

1886 births
1940 deaths
People from Turku
Landscape painters
20th-century Finnish painters
Burials at Hietaniemi Cemetery